Testify is a Southern Gospel/Contemporary Christian vocal band founded by two brothers, Kenneth Swanner and Brent Swanner in 1995. Testify has performed at the Southern Baptist Convention, multiple State Baptist Conventions, Gaither Homecoming Concerts, Chick-fil-a Corporate Headquarters, Theaters in Branson, at TBN, the Grand Ole Opry, GMT and in Nashville for a concert at Lifeway Christian Resource Center of the Southern Baptist Convention. In October 2001 Testify performed at the Roy Acuff Theater for the "Heal Our Land Benefit Concert" for the victims of 9/11.

History 
Brent and Kenneth Swanner grew up in a musical family and started singing at an early age.  Both were heavily involved in their church and school music programs.  Out of college, Kenneth joined The Continental Singers and toured several years all over the world.  Meanwhile, while Brent was performing in a school musical, he was discovered by Waine Self, founder of the Southern Gospel group, Higher Kingdom In 1994, Brent and Kenneth collaborated at a Youth Evangelism Conference and "Testify" was born.  Brent and Kenneth officially formed "Testify" in February 1995.  After months of concerts with just the two of them they added an old college buddy, Daniel Steele to sing the baritone. They recorded an Independent, Self Titled album at a local studio in 1995.  In 1996 Testify won The Albert E Brumley Memorial Gospel Singing Contest in Springdale, AR. A year later Daniel Steele moved to bass and Philip Bergeron took over the baritone.  In the meantime, Testify signed with Son Sound Music Group and recorded, Testify Self Titled, produced by Danny Funderburk of The Cathedral Quartet fame.  Testify then released their first single ever, "Jesus Left Heaven for Me"  and garnered major radio play and some chart success.   In 1997 , Son Sound Music Group promoted Testify to their major label, Son Sound Masterpiece and Testify recorded Ready to Serve, produced by Danny Funderburk and Lari Goss.

In 1999,  Landon Thompson joined the group and Testify began working with Grammy Award nominee and Dove Award winning producer, Michael Sykes. Michael produced two recordings for Testify. They are called, Something Worth Living For and Keep Walking.  Something Worth Living For included Testify's first ever Top 40 song, "He's Still Keeping Me".  Testify and Michael Sykes second collaboration, Keep Walking, produced Testify's first Top 10 single, "Doubter To A Shouter".

In 2004, with the release of The Highest Call, Testify changed their overall sound.  In an effort to keep pushing the creative limits of the group, Testify enlisted Buddy Mullins, former member of The Mullins, The Gaither Vocal Band and Sunday Drive to produce.  The first single from The Highest Call, "All It Takes Is A Shout",  immediately entered the Top 40 on The Singing News chart.  Testify's next single from The Highest Call, "In God We Trust", prompted a letter from then President, George W. Bush, to write Testify a letter thanking them for such a timely song.  With the success of The Highest Call,  Testify was nominated for the 2005 Diamond Award Trio of the Year and SGM Awards Trio of the Year.  In addition to The Highest Call, Buddy Mullins went on to produce two more Testify recordings, Rhythm of Grace and Shine on Us. Rhythm of Grace included another Top 40 song, "That's Why He Came".  Buddy's influence and comradery with the guys was undeniable. He became an honorary member of the group filling in for Kenneth Swanner at lead vocals when needed.

The Farewell Tour 
In 2012, Brent and Kenneth Swanner reevaluated the future of the ministry. After close to eighteen years together, Brent and Kenneth decide to announce their Farewell Tour.  On November 17, 2012, they performed their final concert at First West (First Baptist Church West Monroe, LA), the city where Testify's 18-year journey first started. At that concert, various individuals (including family members, record producers, management, former members and Buddy Mullins contributions to Testify's ministry.  Several former members and Buddy Mullins performed with Testify.  To commemorate the Farewell Tour, Testify recorded their 13th and final album, Songs We Love to honor their Southern Gospel and CCM influences.

Life after Testify 
Brent Swanner recorded a solo album in 2013, And the Story Goes On.  In 2020 a single was released in honor of his youngest son, "The First Time Ever I Saw Your Face".  Brent currently manages a construction company in West Monroe, LA.  Kenneth Swanner works at a bank in North Louisiana and is a pastor at a local church. Landon Thompson is a worship leader at a church in Houston, Texas.

Studio albums
source:

Compilations

Live albums

Singles

References 

Performers of contemporary Christian music

Southern gospel performers

Contemporary Christian music